Bogachiel State Park is a  public recreation area on the Bogachiel River  south of the city of Forks on Highway 101 in Clallam County, Washington. The state park was established in 1931, with initial management and development performed under the auspices of the Bogachiel Improvement Club and Forks Chamber of Commerce. State staffing began in 1961. The park has facilities for picnicking, camping, and hiking.

References

External links
Bogachiel State Park Washington State Parks and Recreation Commission 
Bogachiel State Park Map Washington State Parks and Recreation Commission

State parks of Washington (state)
Parks in Clallam County, Washington
Protected areas established in 1931